USS Cromwell (DE-1014), a , was a ship of the United States Navy named for Captain John P. Cromwell (1901–1943), who was awarded the Medal of Honor posthumously for his sacrificial heroism while commanding a wolf pack from the submarine .

Cromwell was launched 4 June 1954 by Bath Iron Works Corp., Bath, Maine; sponsored by Miss A. Cromwell; and commissioned 24 November 1954.

From her home port at Naval Station Newport, Rhode Island, Cromwell joined in antisubmarine exercises in waters from Iceland to the Virgin Islands, took part in fleet exercises in the Caribbean, and served as schoolship for the Fleet Sonar School at Key West. In September and October 1957, she joined in NATO exercises which took her to ports in England and France, and between May and October 1958, had her first tour of duty in the Mediterranean. During that eventful summer, she joined in patrolling the eastern Mediterranean during the Lebanon Crisis.

Between February and April 1959, Cromwell sailed on a cruise which took her through the Panama Canal to a number of ports on the west coast of South America, and exercises with ships of the Peruvian Navy. In August, September, and October 1959, she crossed the Atlantic once more for NATO operations, and during the first half of 1960 concentrated on amphibious exercises with Marines along the North Carolina coast. Cromwell took part in NATO exercises in the fall of 1960, then returned to East Coast operations for the remainder of the year.

 [1961–1972]

Cromwell was stricken from the Naval Vessel Register 5 July 1972. She was scheduled to be transferred to New Zealand, but that fell through, and she was sold for scrapping 15 June 1973.

References

External links 
 navsource.org: USS Cromwell
   hazegray.org: USS Cromwell
 

Dealey-class destroyer escorts
Ships built in Bath, Maine
1954 ships